The Wasps Stabia Rugby was a rugby union club in the town of Castellammare di Stabia, near Naples in Italy that play in Serie C, the fourth division of the national league.

History 
The club was founded in 2006 by Fabio D'Arco and Gianclaudio Romeo.
During its life, the club took part in Seria C of the Italian championship. In 2012 won the Italian Regional Cup Under 18.
From 2010 and 2012, it was led by the president Gianandrea de Antonellis.

Links to other clubs 
The supporters of Stabia have been quick to form links with other clubs, notably Wasps, a Premiership team in England.

See also 
 Italian Rugby Federation

External links 
Official site

Rugby clubs established in 2006
Italian rugby union teams
Wasps RFC
2006 establishments in Italy